Saint Modoald, also known as Romoald, was the Frankish archbishop of Trier from 626 to 645. He is the patron saint of the Reichsabtei Helmarshausen and his liturgical feast is on 12 May.

Modoald was born in Aquitaine, the son of Arnulf, later Bishop of Metz.

He had been at the Court of the Merovingian King Dagobert I, when the King had him made Archbishop of Trier. Germanus of Granfelden was from a wealthy senatorial family of Trier. His father entrusted him at a young age to Bishop Modoald, for his education.

Modoald established the community of Saint-Symphorien, on the Moselle; and placed it under the supervision of his sister Saint Severa.

Family

References

Medieval German saints
7th-century Frankish bishops
7th-century archbishops
Roman Catholic bishops of Trier
Pippinids
7th-century Frankish saints